Yokosuka Naval Base may refer to:

United States Fleet Activities Yokosuka, the present United States naval base located next to the city, beginning in 1945
JMSDF Yokosuka Naval Base (横須賀基地_(海上自衛隊)), which hosts the headquarters of the Japanese Maritime Self Defense Force as well as several major units assigned to the District Force.
Yokosuka Naval District was a historical administrative district established under the Imperial Japanese Navy in 1886.

Related:
 
JMSDF Yokosuka District Force (横須賀地方隊) a modern naval district of Japan's territorial waters (see Japan Maritime Self-Defense Force#Organization, formations and structure)

Naval Air Technical Arsenal at Yokosuka, an aircraft manufacturer located in the city from the 1910s to the 1930s.
Yokosuka Naval Arsenal, a shipyard located outside the city from the 1860s to 1945
Yokosuka Naval Airfield a WWII-era airfield